Pierre Gill  is a Canadian cinematographer and film and television director. A Montreal native, he is closely associated with Quebecois cinema, and has collaborated with directors like Jean-Marc Vallée, Charles Binamé, Christian Duguay, Allan Moyle, and Denis Villeneuve, working on such films as Black List, The Art of War, Lost and Delirious, The Rocket, Polytechnique, and Upside Down. He served as the second unit director of photography on Villeneuve's Blade Runner 2049, which won the Academy Award for Best Cinematography.

He has also directed episodes of the television series Charlie Jade and the made-for-television film The Last Casino.

Filmography

Film

Short films

Television 

TV movies
 In the Presence of Mine Enemies (1997)
 Salem Witch Trials (2002)
 Fakers (2010)
 Cyberbully (2011)

Other credits

Awards and nominations

ASC Awards 

 Nominated: ASC Award for Outstanding Achievement in Outstanding Achievement in Cinematography in Movies of the Week/Mini-Series/Pilot; Joan of Arc (2000)
 Won: ASC Award for Outstanding Achievement in Outstanding Achievement in Cinematography in Movies of the Week/Mini-Series/Pilot; Hitler: The Rise of Evil (2003)
 Nominated: ASC Award for Outstanding Achievement in Cinematography in Regular Series; The Borgias (2014)

Canadian Screen Awards/Genie Awards 

 Nominated: Genie Award for Best Achievement in Cinematography; Black List (1996)
 Nominated: Genie Award for Best Achievement in Cinematography; Memories Unlocked (2000)
 Nominated: Genie Award for Best Achievement in Cinematography; The Art of War (2001)
 Won: Genie Award for Best Achievement in Cinematography; Lost and Delirious (2002)
 Won: Genie Award for Best Achievement in Cinematography; The Rocket (2006)
 Nominated: Genie Award for Best Achievement in Cinematography; The American Trap (2009)
 Won: Genie Award for Best Achievement in Cinematography; Polytechnique (2010)
 Nominated: Canadian Screen Award for Best Cinematography; Upside Down (2013)

CSC Awards 

 Won: CSC Award for Best Cinematography in a TV Drama; Joan of Arc (2000)
 Won: CSC Award for Best Cinematography in Theatrical Feature; Memories Unlocked (2000)
 Won: CSC Award for Best Cinematography in Theatrical Feature; The Art of War (2001)
 Won: CSC Award for Best Cinematography in Theatrical Feature; Lost and Delirious (2002)
 Won: CSC Award for Best Cinematography in a TV Drama; Hitler: The Rise of Evil (2004)
 Nominated: CSC Award for Best Cinematography in Theatrical Feature; The Rocket (2006)
 Nominated: CSC Award for Best Cinematography in Theatrical Feature; The American Trap (2009)
 Nominated: CSC Award for Best Cinematography in a TV Drama; Fakers (2011)
 Won: CSC Award for Best Cinematography in a TV Drama; Cyberbully (2012)
 Won: CSC Award for Best Cinematography in a TV Series; Copper (2014)
 Nominated: CSC Cinematographer Award for Best TV Drama; Ascension (2016)

Gemini Awards 

 Nominated: Gemini Award for Best Direction in a Dramatic Program or Mini-Series; The Last Casino (2005)
 Nominated: Gemini Award for Best Direction in a Dramatic Program or Mini-Series; Fakers (2011)

Prix Gémeaux 

 Won: Prix Gémeaux meilleure direction-photo: Toutes catégories, film; Marguerite Volant (1997)

Prix Jutra 

 Won: Prix Jutra Meilleure Direction de la Photographie; Memories Unlocked (2000)
 Nominated: Prix Jutra Meilleure Direction de la Photographie; The Art of War (2001)
 Nominated: Prix Jutra Meilleure Direction de la Photographie; The Rocket (2006)
 Won: Prix Jutra Meilleure Direction de la Photographie; Polytechnique (2010)
 Nominated: Prix Jutra Meilleure Direction de la Photographie; Elephant Song (2016)

Mar del Plata International Film Festival 

 Won: ADF Cinematography Award; Lost and Delirious (2001)

Milano International Film Festival 

 Won: MIFF Award for Best Cinematography; The Rocket (2006)

References

External links
 

Canadian cinematographers
Canadian television directors
Best Cinematography Genie and Canadian Screen Award winners
Living people
People from Montreal
Year of birth missing (living people)
Place of birth missing (living people)
Best Cinematography Jutra and Iris Award winners